Ballads for Bass Clarinet is an album by David Murray, recorded in 1991 and released by DIW Records.

Music and recording
The album was recorded in October 1991 by the quartet of Murray (bass clarinet), pianist John Hicks, bassist Ray Drummond, and drummer Idris Muhammad. There is a short passage of anguish in "Portrait of a Black Woman".

Reception

Ballads for Bass Clarinet was released by DIW Records. The AllMusic review awarded the album 3 stars. The Penguin Guide to Jazz commented on the similarity between Murray's phrasing on bass clarinet and on tenor saxophone.

Track listing
 "Waltz to Heaven" – 9:36
 "New Life" – 9:05 
 "Chazz" (Wilber Morris) – 8:43
 "Portrait of a Black Woman – for Mae Francis Owens" – 11:39 
 "Lyons Street" (Idris Muhammad) – 3:21
 "Elegy for Fannie Lou" (Kunle Mwanga) – 9:46
All compositions by David Murray except as indicated.

Personnel
David Murray – bass clarinet
John Hicks – piano
Ray Drummond – bass
Idris Muhammad – drums

References

David Murray (saxophonist) albums
DIW Records albums
1993 albums